Selim Sahab is a conductor and contemporary composer. Sahab was born in Mandatory Palestine in 1941, but is now a citizen of Egypt.

Sahab obtained a Bachelor of Choral Conducting in 1971 from the Institute of Jnesen.
In 1976, he obtained a diploma in Symphony Orchestra Conducting from the Moscow Tchaikovsky Conservatory. In 1977, Sahab returned to Lebanon and wrote reviews that were published in Lebanese and Arabic newspapers and magazines.
Sahab also worked as a musical supervisor for the official Lebanese radio station. He established the Beirut Arab Music Ensemble for Arabic Music in Lebanon in 1980.

He is now the head of 'Opera Masr', as well as being given the title of 'Good Will Ambassador'.

Founder

In Lebanon 
 Beirut Arab Music Ensemble
 Lebanon Children's Choir

In Egypt 
National Arab Music Ensemble
Cairo Opera Children's Choir
Children Choir for the General Services of Heliopolis
Choral groups in the Maternal and Child Welfare Association

See also 
Cairo Opera House
سليم سحاب
list of Egyptians

References

External links 
The National Arabic Music Ensemble Official web site
Cairo Opera House Official web site

Egyptian conductors (music)
1941 births
Musicians from Cairo
Living people
21st-century conductors (music)